Chris Vance is the name of:

Chris Vance (politician) (born 1962), American Republican politician
Chris Vance (actor) (born 1971), English actor